Richard Reader was an Irish Dean in the last decade of the 17th century and the first year of the 18th.
 
A former Dean of Emly, Reader was briefly Dean of Kilmore in 1700.

References

Irish Anglicans
Deans of Emly
Deans of Kilmore